Maslinic acid is a compound derived from dry olive-pomace oil (an olive skin wax) which is a byproduct of olive oil extraction. It is a member of the group of triterpenes known as oleananes.

Pharmacology
In vitro study shows that maslinic acid inhibits serine proteases, key enzymes necessary for the spread of HIV within an individual's body. It also has in vitro antiproliferative effects on colon cancer cells.  Maslinic acid increases EAAT2 (GLT-1) glutamate reuptake and may reduce glutamatergic toxicity in rats.

References

Triterpenes
Carboxylic acids
Vicinal diols